Alternative Energy: Political, Economic, and Social Feasibility (Lanham, Maryland: Rowman & Littlefield, 2006. ), a 2006 book by Christopher A. Simon, discusses the transition from fossil fuels to renewable energy. The book has been called a "sophisticated, insightful, and well written book on the current global push to adopt varying forms of alternative energy, from wind to solar, geothermal, hydrogen, and beyond".

In 2008, Christopher Simon, associate professor of political science at the University of Nevada, Reno, was named the “Technology Educator of the Year” by Nevada's Center for Entrepreneurship and Technology.

References

Renewable energy commercialization
2006 non-fiction books
2006 in the environment